Sexuality has a prominent role within the theology of the Church of Jesus Christ of Latter-day Saints (LDS Church), which teaches that gender is defined in the premortal existence, and that part of the purpose of mortal life is for men and women to be sealed together, forming bonds that allow them to progress eternally together in the afterlife. It also teaches that sexual relations within the framework of opposite-sex marriage are healthy, necessary, and ordained of God.

While official church messaging is relatively liberal regarding sex within opposite-sex and heterosexual marriages, it retains conservative doctrines regarding premarital sex. In accordance with the law of chastity, LDS Church doctrine bars sexual activity outside of heterosexual marriage.

Chastity

The LDS Church teaches its members to obey the law of chastity, which is a code of morality and modesty. Under this code, all members are taught to be "morally clean in their thoughts, words, and actions" and to abstain from pornography. Violations of this code include "adultery, being without natural affection, lustfulness, infidelity, incontinence, filthy communications, impurity, inordinate affection, fornication. They included all sexual relations outside marriage—petting, sex perversion, and preoccupation with sex in one’s thoughts and talking."

Though celestial marriage is the only form of marriage recognized as a sacrament, the church permits sex within government-recognized marital unions, the notable exceptions being same-sex marriage, common law marriage, civil unions (in jurisdictions where marriage is available), and polygamy. The church is sensitive about its historical relationship with polygamy, and entry into a polygamous marriage, even where legal, will result in mandatory consideration of church discipline and possible excommunication. Today, the church's teachings allow married couples to decide what is appropriate sexual behavior between themselves. The law of chastity has also been interpreted to include various standards of modesty, which have varied according to cultural norms of the time. Serious offenses of the law of chastity may result in church discipline, including the possibility of excommunication.

LGBT members of the church are expected to keep the law of chastity. The church characterizes its church discipline policy as neutral regarding sexual orientation. If gay or lesbian members desire to enter into a heterosexual marriage, they are advised that they should first learn to deal with their homosexual feelings; otherwise, they must remain celibate. Gay or lesbian sex, in any form, whether the participants are married or not, is grounds for church discipline. Participation in "repeated homosexual activities (by adults)" results in the First Presidency making a permanent special annotation to a person's membership record. In most cases, gay or lesbian sex bars a person, permanently, from serving as a church missionary.

Soaking

In 2021, reports of LDS Church members "soaking" as a workaround to the church's sexual restrictions made international news and received millions of views and social media tags. Many described the rumors as a myth while others stated that they knew people who had participated in the action. Other articles described a related act among LDS members of "jump humping" where two people soak while another jumps on the bed beside them. Soaking between two LDS characters was discussed on the 2013 Amazon comedy series Alpha House.

Masturbation

On many occasions church leaders have taught that members should not masturbate as part of obedience to the law of chastity. Salient examples of this include a church guide to stop masturbating produced in the 1970s. Another is the 1990 edition of the church's youth guidelines pamphlet which stated that the "Lord specifically forbids ... masturbation" with the next two editions (including the most current one) alluding to it with statements forbidding anything that "arouses" any sexual feelings or emotions in one's "own body". Apostle Spencer W. Kimball, who later served as church president, warned of the "possible damages" and "dangers" of this "common indescretion" on various occasions calling it a "reprehensible sin" that grows "with every exercise".  The apostle Boyd K. Packer gave a 1976 general conference address "To Young Men Only" warning young men not to tamper with their little factory (a euphemism for their reproductive system) lest it speed up and become a guilt- and depression-inducing habit that is not easy to resist. He gave vigorous exercise as a method to help control thoughts and break the habit of masturbation since it is a "transgression" that is "not pleasing to the Lord". The talk was printed as a pamphlet and widely distributed by the church from 1980 to 2016. Since 1985 the church has provided a manual for parents to use in discussing sexuality with their children. The manual includes statements that "prophets have condemned [masturbation] as a sin" and "perversion of the body's passions" that causes one to "become carnal". The most recent explicit mention of masturbation by top leaders in public discourse was by Tad R. Callister who stated in a 2013 speech at BYU-Idaho that God "condemns self-abuse" (a euphemism for masturbation).

Kissing
Church leaders have stated that outside of marriage "passionate kisses", defined as "more intense and last[ing] longer than a brief kiss", and "prolonged kisses that involve the tongue and excite the passions" are "off limits". For example, church president Spencer W. Kimball, called the "soul kiss" an "abomination" that leads to necking, petting, and "illegitimate babies". He further stated that even when dating for a time a kiss should be a "clean, decent, sexless one like the kiss between a mother and son". He also stated that kissing during casual dating is "asking for trouble" and that kisses should not be "handed out like pretzels". Apostle Richard G. Scott advised that physical expressions of romantic feelings between unmarried individuals should be kept to "those that are comfortable in the presence of your parents".

Erotic touch
Church leaders have also condemned erotic touching outside of heterosexual marriage using terms like "necking" for general kissing and stroking of areas outside of the breasts, buttocks, or groin region, and "petting" for "fondling a member of the opposite sex in areas that are private, personal, and sacred" whether under or over clothing. Necking (passionate kissing with intimate touching) has been called an "insidious practice" while petting was called "sinful" and "an abomination before God". Despite the policies on extramarital sex and making out, a 2007 survey of over 1,000 BYU students showed that 4% of single women and 3% of single men had participated in oral sex or intercourse while dating. Additionally, 54% of men and 46% of women BYU students reported "making out and intense kissing" while dating.

Oral sex
In the early 1980s, the church explicitly banned oral sex even for married couples as it was considered an "unnatural, impure, or unholy practice", which reflected verbiage for sexual misconduct in the church's General Handbook. In a January 5, 1982, First Presidency letter to bishops and other local leaders, it was explicitly stated that members who participated in any oral sex were barred from the temple unless they "repented and discontinued" this practice. A follow-up letter nine months later on October 15, 1982, stated that the First Presidency had received numerous complaints of church leaders inappropriately "delving into private, sensitive matters" and directed leaders to never inquire with "explicit questions" about "intimate matters involving marital relations". The oral sex ban, however, was not removed, modified, or clarified, and the only additional directive to leaders was that "if the member has enough anxiety about the propriety of the conduct to ask about it, the best course would be to discontinue it".

Subsequent discussion of marital sex warned against behaviors that the church considered unnatural, impure, and unholy, including general authority Spencer J. Condie's warning that when couples "participate in unholy practices" during their physical intimacy it can become a "disruptive force" in their marriage. When discussing physical intimacy, a 2003 church manual on marriage quotes church president Spencer W. Kimball, who stated that the idea that "behind the bedroom doors anything goes" is not true nor condoned by the Lord and "if it is unnatural, you just don't do it". In a private letter dated May 17, 1973, church president Harold B. Lee called "oral lovemaking" a "degrading" "perversion" that was "abhorrent in the sight of the Lord". In a popular book sold by the church's bookstore and cowritten by a BYU professor, the authors state that oral sex is unworthy and impure for married couples. An LDS magazine published a bishop's teaching in 2013 that oral sex was forbidden before marriage. Two BYU graduate Mormon sex therapists, however, publicly stated in 2013 that oral sex was acceptable for married couples as did another LDS therapist in 2014.

Pornography

LDS Church leaders have repeatedly condemned the use of sexually arousing literature and visual material for decades. They have compared pornography to a plague or epidemic that is overpoweringly addictive like hard drugs such as cocaine on multiple occasions. They've also stated that viewing erotic material can become a habit that's "almost impossible to break" which can metaphorically "blast a crater" in the brain. The church hosts meetings and has a website to assist members who wish to curb their consumption of pornographic material, and has asked church members to attend an anti-pornography rally. Church leaders have also stated that women who dress immodestly become pornography to men around them.

The Church Handbook states that the three bishopric members should ensure that members from ages 12 to 17 are interviewed twice a year during which they are to discuss the "importance of obeying the commandments, particularly ... refraining from any kind of sexual activity, and refraining from viewing, reading, or listening to pornographic material." It also states that disciplinary council should not be called for members "who are struggling with pornography or self-abuse."

Sociological research into pornography and LDS individuals has included one BYU study that showed of 192 male BYU students ages 18–27, 100% of the sample considered viewing pornography "unacceptable". However, 35% reported having used pornography in the past 12 months, with 9.2% of the entire sample reporting viewing pornography at least once in the last month. No data was collected on female students. A nationwide study of paid porn subscriptions showed that the predominantly LDS state of Utah had the highest subscription rate of any state. Utah's LDS then governor Gary Herbert officially declared pornography to be a public health crisis in Utah in 2016. In 2017 the church school BYU released a study using data gathered online from nearly 700 unmarried English-speaking adults on the effects of religiosity on perceptions of porn addictiveness and relationship anxiety. The results showed that seeing oneself as addicted to pornography generated far more anxiety- and shame-related negative outcomes individually and in romantic relationships than any potential negative effects of consuming sexually explicit material. Additionally, individuals reporting higher religiosity were more likely to consider themselves addicted to porn regardless of their comparative usage rate.

Dancing
Currently and in the past LDS Church leaders have looked down on dancing that includes full-body contact or is suggestive of sexual behavior. One youth guide stated that these unapproved movements deemed vulgar included shoulder or hip shaking, body jerking, crouching, slumping over, and backbending.

Birth control

Teachings on birth control have changed over the course of the church's history going from condemning it as sinful to allowing it. The current church stance as of 2023 is that "decisions about birth control and the consequences of those decisions rest solely with each married couple" and that they should consider "the physical and mental health of the mother and father and their capacity to provide the basic necessities of life for their children" when planning a family. The church discouraged surgical sterilization, like vasectomies and tubal ligation. It also states that elective abortions as a form of birth control are against God's commandments.

In the past the use of birth control methods including artificial contraception was explicitly condemned as pernicious and sinful. In 1969 the first and only First Presidency statement on birth control was released; it reemphasized that it was "contrary to the teachings of the Church artificially to curtail or prevent the birth of children", though, for the first time there was a clarification that men should be considerate to "conserve" the "health and strength" of their wives when planning families since they carry the "greater responsibility" for bearing and rearing children. As recently as 2003 a church manual was published containing a quote from the late church president Spencer W. Kimball stating that the church does not "condone nor approve of" measures of contraception which greatly "limit the family".

Before 2023 the church's insurance company Deseret Mutual Benefits Administrators which provides coverage for its employees did not cover any form of birth control. In 2023 the church company began covering many types of birth control except emergency contraception (i.e. the-morning-after pill). However, it still does not cover any sterilization (whether by vasectomy or tubal ligation) for a couple unless the woman has already had five children or is over forty.

Abortion

The LDS Church opposes elective abortion "for personal or social convenience" but states that abortion could be an acceptable option in cases of rape, incest, danger to the health or life of the mother, or where the fetus has been diagnosed with "severe defects that will not allow the baby to survive beyond birth." As of 2019 baptismal candidates who confess during a baptismal interview to having had or encouraging an abortion require special clearance from a full-time mission president before baptism. In a 2011, US-wide, Pew poll, of the 600 LDS-identifying respondents, 27% said abortion should be legal in all or most cases, and 70% said it should be illegal in all or most cases.

Marriage

From the 1830s, marriage has been a central and distinctive component of Mormon theology. Mormon teachings on marriage begins with the belief that, if performed by a person who has the requisite priesthood authority, a marriage may continue in the afterlife. Such a marriage is called a "celestial marriage" or a "temple marriage", and is a particular instance of a "sealing" which binds people together in the afterlife. Celestial marriage is considered to be a requirement for entry into the highest "degree" of the celestial kingdom (the highest degree of heaven in Latter Day Saint theology), and is thought to allow the participants to continue to have spirit children in the afterlife and become gods. According to Mormon belief, the continuance of a celestial marriage in the afterlife is contingent upon the couple remaining righteous.

In the 1800s, the practice of celestial marriage included plural marriage, a form of polygamy. According to a consensus of historians, the practice of plural marriage was taught by Joseph Smith, the founder of the Latter Day Saint movement, and after Smith's death was formally acknowledged in 1852 by Brigham Young, leader of the LDS Church. The practice became famous during the 19th century when it was opposed and outlawed by the United States federal government, resulting in an intense legal conflict, which culminated in LDS Church president Wilford Woodruff issuing the 1890 Manifesto, which officially discontinued the creation of new plural marriages in church temples. Nevertheless, unofficial plural marriages continued within the LDS Church after 1890 for some years, often in Mexico. In 1904, the church issued a Second Manifesto, which discontinued the official practice worldwide and established excommunication as a possible penalty for violators. These manifestos did not automatically divorce existing plural unions, however, and some couples in the LDS Church continued to live together as plural families well into the 20th century, with the final polygamous marriage in the LDS Church ending in 1954 when one of Edward Eyring's two wives died.

The LDS Church now embraces monogamy and the nuclear family. Members who are found entering into or solemnizing polygamous marriages or associating with polygamous groups are now subject to church discipline and possible excommunication. Beginning in the late-20th century, the LDS Church began supporting political and legal measures to limit legal marriage to a union of one man and one woman.

The LDS Church does, however, continue to recognize some theological aspects of its polygamy doctrine. Although both men and women may enter a celestial marriage with only one partner at a time, a man may be sealed to more than one woman. If his first wife dies, he may enter another celestial marriage, and be sealed to both his living wife and deceased wife or wives. A woman, however, may only be sealed to one man during her lifetime. In the 1950s, one influential church leader opined that plural marriage would "obviously" be reinstituted after the Second Coming of Jesus.

While not accorded the theological significance of a celestial marriage, the LDS Church does recognize civil marriages or marriages performed within other religious traditions. In the 1870s, a prominent Mormon writer wrote that Mormons considered such a marriage to be "no marriage at all." Today, however,  non-celestial marriages are respected and recognized as valid by the church, but such marriages must be legal according to the government where the marriage is performed, and must not be a same-sex marriage, polygamous marriage, common law marriage, or other type of non-ceremonial marriages in non–common law countries.  Moreover, such marriages are thought to last only for the mortal life, and not into the next. In countries where the church's celestial marriages are not recognized by the government, the church requires that it be preceded by a civil marriage.

In the United States, the LDS Church has expressed support for a constitutional ban on same-sex and polygamous marriage and has stated that it "favors measures that define marriage as the union of a man and a woman and that do not confer legal status on any other sexual relationship." The church's position is that government recognition of such rights will "undermine the divinely created institution of the family".

Sexual orientation

The church recognizes and officially welcomes gays and lesbians as members under condition that they attempt to live the church's moral code. The church teaches that homosexual feelings, as distinct from behavior, may sometimes seem to be inborn, and that although these feelings are sometimes unwanted, they can and should be controlled. The church's law of chastity forbids homosexual sex in all contexts. Consistently breaking the law of chastity may result in excommunication. Nevertheless, Latter-day Saints who identify themselves as gay or lesbian may remain in good standing in the church, without ramification, if they abstain from homosexual relations.

In addition to opposing gay and lesbian sex, the LDS Church also opposes and campaigns against the extension of marital rights to gay and lesbian families that would, in its opinion, undermine the tradition of heterosexual monogamous marriage. Since the 1990s, the issue of same-sex marriage has been one of the church's foremost political concerns.

In 2008, the church participated in a campaign in support of California Proposition 8, which proposed limiting the definition of marriage to a union of one man and one woman. This mobilized many of its members to donate time and money towards the initiative. The political organization ProtectMarriage.com, the official proponents of Proposition 8, estimate that about half the donations they received came from Mormon sources, and that "eighty to ninety percent" of the early volunteers going door-to-door were members of the LDS Church. The church was criticized for its involvement by non-members and by some of its members, and in 2010, general authority Marlin K. Jensen personally apologized to church members in California for the church's role. In December 2012 a landmark website "Mormons and Gays" was launched dedicated to the topic of homosexuality.

Gender

Gender identity and roles play an important part in Mormon theology which teaches a strict binary of spiritual gender as literal offspring of divine parents. Part of Sunday Church meetings are currently divided by biological sex, and for most of the 1800s church presidents Joseph Smith and Brigham Young had men, women, and children sit separately for all Sunday meetings. Expressions and identities for sexuality and gender are "separate, but related" aspects of a person and stem from similar biological origins. As far as gender minorities, Church leaders have stated that they have unfinished business in teaching on the difficult and sensitive topic of transgender individuals. In the past, church president Joseph Fielding Smith, stated that he believed that those who did not reach the celestial kingdom in the afterlife would be "neither man nor woman, merely immortal beings".

Within the church, there have also been a number of unofficial statements regarding gender. For example, "Strengthening Our Families: An In-Depth Look at the Proclamation on the Family" (a book compiled by the School of Family Life at the church-owned Brigham Young University) states, "Although we do not fully understand the eternal nature of gender, we should acknowledge its meaning and purpose, and humbly seek to understand and appreciate the nature of divine gender distinctions in God's plan for His children." The book also states: God created us male and female. This is not a mistake or a variety of genetic or hormonal chance. What we call gender is an essential characteristic of our existence prior to our birth. Gender is part of our eternal identity and essential to our eternal progression. Although we may not know all the reasons why this is so, we do know some of the reasons why gender is essential to our eternal progression. To achieve our exaltation, an eternal marriage between a man and a woman is necessary. ...The sexual union between a married man and woman is, among other things, the means God has ordained to bring His spirit children into mortality, which is an essential step in the plan of salvation. Apostle David A. Bednar stated: "[Gender] in large measure defines who we are, why we are here upon the earth, and what we are to do and become. For divine purposes, male and female spirits are different, distinctive, and complementary. ...The unique combination of spiritual, physical, mental, and emotional capacities of both males and females were needed to implement the plan of happiness". Apostle M. Russell Ballard taught, "The premortal and mortal natures of men and women were specified by God Himself. ...[Sometimes women] ask: 'Is a woman's value dependent exclusively upon her role as a wife and mother?' The answer is simple and obvious: No. ...Every righteous man and woman has a significant role to play in the onward march of the kingdom of God."

See also

 Christian views on contraception: The Church of Jesus Christ of Latter-day Saints
 Christianity and abortion: The Church of Jesus Christ of Latter-day Saints

Notes

References
.
 
 
 
.
 

 
Latter Day Saint movement and society